S.P. Sen Verma, is a former Chief Election Commissioner of India serving from 1 October 1967 to 30 September 1972.

External links
 List of former CEC of India

Year of birth missing (living people)
Possibly living people
Chief Election Commissioners of India